Applecross Bay is large remote tidal coastal embayment, located next to the small fishing village of Applecross and is on the west coast of the Applecross peninsula in the Wester Ross part of Ross and Cromarty, in the Scottish Highlands in the west coast of Scotland. It lies between Loch Torridon and Loch Kishorn. The village of Applecross was established by St. Moalrubha, in the 7th century. A sculptured stone is the only relic of St. Moalrubha remaining, who built a chapel there.

Settlements
This row of houses which is often referred to as Applecross, and is marked as Applecross on some maps and sits at the head of the bay, is actually called 'Shore Street' and is referred to locally just as 'The Street'. The name Applecross applies to all the settlements around the peninsula, including Toscaig, Culduie, Camusterrach, Sand, and many others. Applecross is also the name of the local estate and the civil parish, which includes Shieldaig and Torridon, and has a population of 544.

Geography
Applecross bay is over looked by the flat plain of the Applecross peninsula, which is bounded on three sides, by three hills.

Gallery

See also
 List of lochs in Scotland
 List of reservoirs and dams in the United Kingdom

References

Bays of Ross and Cromarty